Coonoor taluk is a taluk of Nilgiris district of the Indian state of Tamil Nadu. The headquarters of the taluk is the town of Coonoor

Demographics
According to the 2011 census, the taluk of Coonoor had a population of 157,754 with 78,411  males and 79,343 females. There were 1012 women for every 1000 men. The taluk had a literacy rate of 81.73. Child population in the age group below 6 was 6,364 Males and 6,194 Females.

References 

Taluks of Nilgiris district